Nigel Shawn Williams is a Canadian actor and theatre director from Toronto, Ontario.

Williams was born in Jamaica and moved to Canada with his family in childhood. A 1990 graduate of the University of Windsor, his early stage roles included Thomas Coyle's The Tyrant of Pontus, Suzan-Lori Parks' Imperceptible Mutabilities in the Third Kingdom, Robert E. Sherwood's The Petrified Forest and George Bernard Shaw's The Six of Calais.

Career 
Williams won the Dora Mavor Moore Award for Outstanding Performance by a Male in a Principal Role – Play in 1995 for his performance as Paul in John Guare's Six Degrees of Separation.

He won a second Dora as an actor in 2012 for his performance as Lincoln in Obsidian Theatre's production of Suzan-Lori Parks' Topdog/Underdog, and was a nominee in 2013 for his performance as Henry in Canadian Stage's production of David Mamet's Race. As a director, he won the Dora Mavor Moore Award for Outstanding Direction of a Play/Musical in 2006 for his direction of Colleen Wagner's The Monument, and was nominated in 2011 for his direction of Anusree Roy's Brothel #9.

His film and television credits include the television series The City, The Famous Jett Jackson, The Jane Show, XIII: The Conspiracy and The Listener, and the films Phantom Punch, Down in the Delta, Vendetta, Jett Jackson: The Movie, John Q and Brown Girl Begins.

Filmography

Film

Television

References

External links

Living people
Canadian male television actors
Canadian male film actors
Canadian male stage actors
Black Canadian male actors
Canadian theatre directors
Jamaican emigrants to Canada
Male actors from Toronto
University of Windsor alumni
21st-century Canadian male actors
Year of birth missing (living people)